The 2016 European Short Track Speed Skating Championships took place between 22 and 24 January 2016 in Sochi, Russia.

Medal summary

Medal table

Men's events
The results of the Championships:

Women's events

Participating nations

See also
Short track speed skating
European Short Track Speed Skating Championships

References

External links
 Official website
Results book

2016
2016 in Russian sport
2016 in short track speed skating
International speed skating competitions hosted by Russia
Sports competitions in Sochi
January 2016 sports events in Europe